Sir John Williams Benn, 1st Baronet, DL (13 November 1850 – 10 April 1922) was a British politician, particularly associated with London politics. He was the father of the politician William Benn, and the grandfather of the politician Tony Benn.

Life and career
Benn was born in Manchester, to a middle-class family, the eldest son of a Congregationalist minister, the Reverend Julius Benn (c. 1826–1883), and grandson of William Benn, but his parents moved the family to east London the following year, where they opened an institute for homeless boys. Benn was largely homeschooled and at the age of seventeen, he joined a furniture company. He later (1880) established a trade journal, The Cabinet Maker, which eventually became the furniture trade's leading publication: when politics became his main interest, the family's publishing business, Benn Brothers, was taken over by his eldest son Ernest Benn (1875–1954), who later renamed it Ernest Benn Limited. His niece was actress Margaret Rutherford; she was the daughter of Benn's younger brother William Rutherford Benn, who was put into a lunatic asylum following his murder of their father, the Rev. Julius Benn.

When the London County Council was established in January 1889, Benn accepted an invitation to stand as a Progressive Party candidate for East Finsbury and was elected. Like his contemporary Will Crooks, Benn was active in the London Dock Strike of 1889, and, as an increasingly prominent local politician, was invited in 1891 to stand for Parliament as the Liberal Party candidate for St George Division of Tower Hamlets. He won election from the constituency the following year.

He was later narrowly defeated at the general election in 1895, but he concentrated on his continuing work as a London councillor, helping introduce electric trams to London's streets in 1903. A year later, he returned to Parliament after winning a by-election at Devonport, a seat he retained until being defeated in 1910. In the meantime his son, 28-year-old William Wedgwood Benn, had also been elected to Parliament, winning Benn's former seat at St. George in 1906. Benn senior was appointed a deputy lieutenant of the County of London in February 1905.

For his work as an MP, he was knighted in 1906 and created a baronet in 1914. John Benn remained a member of the London County Council until his death in 1922, leading the Progressive Party until ill-health forced him to relinquish that role in 1918. In his final election campaign he was victorious, defeating the Labour Group Leader.

References

External links 
 

1850 births
1922 deaths
Deputy Lieutenants of the County of London
Liberal Party (UK) MPs for English constituencies
Members of London County Council
Baronets in the Baronetage of the United Kingdom
Politicians from Manchester
UK MPs 1892–1895
UK MPs 1900–1906
UK MPs 1906–1910
Progressive Party (London) politicians
John
Members of the Parliament of the United Kingdom for constituencies in Devon
Knights Bachelor
Politicians from Plymouth, Devon